Chinese Taixi can refer to:
Far West (Taixi), 泰西 the Western world 
Taixi (embryonic breathing), 胎息 Daoist meditation and Internal Alchemy methods
Taisi, Yunlin, or Taixi 臺西 a township in Taiwan